In enzymology, a benzene 1,2-dioxygenase is an enzyme that catalyzes the chemical reaction

benzene + NADH + H+ + O2  cis-cyclohexa-3,5-diene-1,2-diol + NAD+

The 4 substrates of this enzyme are benzene, NADH, H+, and O2, whereas its two products are cis-cyclohexa-3,5-diene-1,2-diol and NAD+.

Classification 

This enzyme belongs to the family of oxidoreductases, specifically those acting on paired donors, with O2 as oxidant and incorporation or reduction of oxygen. The oxygen incorporated need not be derived from O2 with NADH or NADPH as one donor, and incorporation of two atoms of oxygen into the other donor.

Nomenclature 

The systematic name of this enzyme class is benzene,NADH:oxygen oxidoreductase (1,2-hydroxylating). Other names in common use include benzene hydroxylase, and benzene dioxygenase.

Biological role 

This enzyme participates in naphthalene and anthracene degradation.  It has 4 cofactors: FAD, Iron, Sulfur,  and Iron-sulfur.

References

 

EC 1.14.12
NADPH-dependent enzymes
NADH-dependent enzymes
Flavoproteins
Iron enzymes
Sulfur enzymes
Iron-sulfur enzymes
Enzymes of unknown structure